Mikkel Delbo Larsen (born 25 February 1985) is a Danish male badminton player.

Achievements

European Junior Championships
Boys' doubles

BWF Grand Prix 
The BWF Grand Prix has two level such as Grand Prix and Grand Prix Gold. It is a series of badminton tournaments, sanctioned by Badminton World Federation (BWF) since 2007.

Mixed doubles

 BWF Grand Prix Gold tournament
 BWF Grand Prix tournament

BWF International Challenge/Series
Men's doubles

Mixed doubles

 BWF International Challenge tournament
 BWF International Series tournament
 BWF Future Series tournament

Invitation Tournament
Mixed doubles

References

External links
 

1985 births
Living people
Danish male badminton players